Charles Elmer Collett (born 1944) is a retired firefighter with the Kentfield Fire District and former professional American football player. He played eleven seasons in the National Football League for the San Francisco 49ers and the Baltimore Colts. He is an actual gold mining "ex-49er" and owner of a gold mining claim in the Sierra foothills on the Middle Fork of the Yuba River. He resides in Stinson Beach, California. Elmer and wife, Lisa Blackburn of Sunnyvale CA, were married in 1980. They are proud parents of sons Ramsey and Casey. Elmer has two brothers and a sister, all of whom reside in California.

Career
He played as a guard in football. He is retired.

References

1944 births
Living people
American football offensive linemen
San Francisco State University alumni
San Francisco 49ers players
Baltimore Colts players
Western Conference Pro Bowl players
San Francisco State Gators football players
Tamalpais High School alumni
Players of American football from Oakland, California
People from Stinson Beach, California